R101 road may refer to:
 R101 road (Ireland)
 R101 road (South Africa)